Akira may refer to:

People
Akira (given name); and a list of people with this given name

Surnamed
Asa Akira (born 1986), an American pornographic actress, model, and director
Elly Akira, Japanese pornographic actress
Francesco Akira (born 1999). Japanese ring name for Italian wrestler Francesco Begnini

Mononymed people
Akira (actor) (born 1981), Japanese actor and dance performer
Akira Nogami (born 1966; ring name "AKIRA"), Japanese professional wrestler and actor
Natalie Horler (born 1981; stage name "Akira"), German singer and television presenter formerly using the stagename "Akira"
Akira the Don, stagename of British DJ Adam Narkiewicz
Akira the Hustler (born 1969), stagename of Japanese artist Yukio Cho

Fictional characters
Akira Yuki, a major character of the Virtua Fighter series of video games
Akira (The Simpsons), a Japanese chef on The Simpsons
Akira (Akira), a character from the 1980s cyberpunk manga of the same name
Akira Hiragi, a character from Valkyrie Drive-Mermaid
Akira Kurusu, the protagonist in the manga adaption of Persona 5
Akira Otoishi, a minor antagonist and antihero in JoJo's Bizarre Adventure
Akira Nijino, a.k.a. ToQ #6, a character from Ressha Sentai ToQger
A-Kira, a.k.a. Minoru Tanaka, a character from Death Note

Arts and entertainment properties
Akira (franchise), a Japanese cyberpunk franchise
Akira (manga), a 1980s cyberpunk manga by Katsuhiro Otomo
Akira (1988 film), an anime film adaptation of the manga
Akira (video game), a 1988 video game based on the anime film
Akira Psycho Ball, a 2002 pinball simulator for PlayStation 2 based on the anime film
Akira (planned film), a planned live-action film adaptation of the manga
Akira (2016 Hindi film), a Bollywood film starring Konkana Sen Sharma, Sonakshi Sinha and Anurag Kashyap
Akira (2016 Kannada film), a Kannada film starring Anish Tejeshwar
Akira (album), a 2017 album by Black Cab
"Akira", a song by Kaddisfly from Buy Our Intention; We'll Buy You a Unicorn

Other uses
Akira class, a class of starship in Star Trek
Akira (climb), a sport climbing route created in 1995 by French climber, Fred Rouhling

See also

 
Akhirah, an Islamic term referring to the afterlife
Aki Ra, former Khmer Rouge conscripted child soldier
Aquila (disambiguation)
Arika, a Japanese video game developer